Corse-du-Sud's 1st constituency is one of two French legislative constituencies in the department of Corse-du-Sud. It is currently represented by Laurent Marcangeli of Horizons.

Historic representation

Elections

2022 

 
 
 
|-
| colspan="8" bgcolor="#E9E9E9"|
|-

2017

2012

References

External links 
Results of legislative elections from 2002 to 2017 by constituency (Ministry of the Interior) 
Results of legislative elections from 1958 to 2012 by constituency (CDSP Sciences Po) 
Results of elections from 1958 to present by constituency (data.gouv.fr) 

1